Eudonia minualis is a species of moth of the family Crambidae. It was described by Francis Walker in 1866. It is endemic to New Zealand.

The larvae feed on mosses on the bark of Olearia bullata and Olearia hectorii.

References

Eudonia
Moths of New Zealand
Moths described in 1866
Endemic fauna of New Zealand
Taxa named by Francis Walker (entomologist)
Endemic moths of New Zealand